HD 8574 is a single star in the equatorial constellation of Pisces. It can be viewed with binoculars or a telescope, but not with the naked eye having a low apparent visual magnitude of +7.12. The distance to this object is 146 light years based on parallax, and it has an absolute magnitude of 3.88. The star is drifting further away from the Sun with a radial velocity of +18 km/s. It has a relatively high proper motion, advancing across the celestial sphere at the rate of 0.298 arc seconds per annum.

The star HD 8574 is named Bélénos. The name was selected in the NameExoWorlds campaign by France, during the 100th anniversary of the IAU. Bélénos was the god of light, of the Sun, and of health in Gaulish mythology.

This object is an F-type star with a stellar classification of F8 and unknown luminosity class. The star is five billion years old and is spinning with a projected rotational velocity of 6.6 km/s. It has 1.1 times the mass of the Sun and 1.4 times the Sun's radius. The star is radiating 2.3 times the luminosity of the Sun from its photosphere at an effective temperature of 6,065 K.

In 2001, an extrasolar planet in an eccentric orbit was announced by the European Southern Observatory. The discovery was published in 2003.

See also
 List of extrasolar planets

References

External links

F-type main-sequence stars
Planetary systems with one confirmed planet
Pisces (constellation)
Durchmusterung objects
008574
006643